Šafránek (feminine Šafránková) is a Czech surname derived from the word šafrán (saffron). Notable people include:
 František Šafránek, Czech footballer
 Jaroslav Šafránek, Czech physicist
 Kateřina Šafránková, Czech athlete
 Libuše Šafránková, Czech actress
 Robert Safranek, American engineer
 Václav Šafránek, Czech tennis player
 Vincent Frank Safranek, Czech-American musician

See also the Hungarian fictional character Safranek.

Czech-language surnames